Drupal Commerce is open-source eCommerce software that augments the content management system Drupal. Within the context of a Drupal-based site, Drupal Commerce presents products for purchase; walks customers through the checkout process; keeps track of invoices, receipts, orders, and payments; facilitates shipping and payment; and performs other functions needed by online merchants.

History

Drupal Commerce was created by Commerce Guys under the leadership of Ryan Szrama, the author of shopping-cart software Übercart. It was originally born as a rearchitecture project of Übercart, and was called "Übercore" until January 14, 2010, when Mr. Szrama renamed it "Drupal Commerce". Version 1.0 was released on August 23, 2011.

Drupal Commerce has had steady growth since its introduction. Over 53,000 active sites use it, including U.K. postal service Royal Mail, international language school Eurocentres, McDonald's (France), and hundreds of consumer brands. The Drupal Commerce market has also supported publication of several instructional books and video courses.

Extending Drupal Commerce

Like Drupal itself, Drupal Commerce can be extended through the use of modules that add functionality and themes that define visual presentation. There are more than 300 Drupal Commerce-specific modules available for free in such categories as payment gateways, shipping service providers, and administrative and development tools.

See also

 Comparison of shopping cart software
Drupal - Wikipedia

References

Free e-commerce software